KUAC-TV (channel 9) is a PBS member television station in Fairbanks, Alaska, United States. Owned by the University of Alaska Fairbanks, it is sister to NPR member station KUAC (89.9 FM). The two outlets share studios in the Great Hall on the UAF campus; KUAC-TV's transmitter is located on Bender Mountain. KUAC-TV is the only PBS station in Alaska that is not part of Alaska Public Television, which was established on July 1, 2012.

History
KUAC-TV signed on for the first time on December 22, 1971, as an early Christmas present to the Interior. It was the first public television station in Alaska, and the only one until KAKM in Anchorage signed on in 1975. It originally aired for only five hours a day, from 5 p.m. to 10 p.m. As the difficulties associated with bringing PBS programming decreased, channel 9 increased its schedule, and now operates 24 hours a day.

In 1995, KUAC-TV joined with KTOO-TV in Juneau and KYUK-TV in Bethel to form AlaskaOne, a network of PBS stations serving all of Alaska outside of Anchorage. The three stations formed the Alaska Public Broadcasting Service to air a common PBS schedule. This move was made in hopes of sharing administrative costs. KTOO and KYUK occasionally broke off from the AlaskaOne feed to air programming relevant to their areas, while KUAC-TV used its massive translator network to deliver AlaskaOne programming across the Interior.

On November 18, 2011. the APBS board voted to transfer the operation of the AlaskaOne feed to Alaska Public Telecommunications, owner of Anchorage's PBS station, KAKM. In response, UAF, which cast the lone dissenting vote, announced on December 11 that KUAC-TV would break off from AlaskaOne and revert to being a separate locally-focused PBS station on July 1, 2012. UAF contended that a single statewide PBS service would not meet the needs of the Interior. On July 1, KUAC-TV resumed its original branding of "KUAC TV9," while KTOO and KYUK joined with KAKM to form Alaska Public Media.

Technical information

Subchannels
The station's digital signal is multiplexed:

In 2004, the station signed on the first high-definition public television service in Alaska.

Analog-to-digital conversion
KUAC-TV shut down its analog signal, over VHF channel 9, in April 2009. The station's digital signal relocated from its pre-transition UHF channel 24 to VHF channel 9.

References

External links
 KUAC-FM-TV
 YouTubeInaugural broadcast of KUAC-TV on December 22, 1971, including introductory comments from University of Alaska president William Ransom Wood

1971 establishments in Alaska
Television channels and stations established in 1971
UAC-TV
PBS member stations
First Nations Experience affiliates